The 1941–42 Boston Bruins season, was the team's 18th season. They placed third in the National Hockey League.

Offseason
Milt Schmidt and Porky Dumart were identified as two players to be called to Canada for compulsory training in the armed forces, potentially breaking up the Bruins' top line. Canadian authorities threatened to disallow any single men between the ages of 21 and 25 from leaving Canada to play ice hockey. However, the two were not called to the forces and played another season for the Bruins.

Regular season
On December 9, 1941, the Chicago Blackhawks-Boston Bruins game would be delayed for over a half hour as United States President Franklin Delano Roosevelt declared that America was at war.

Final standings

Record vs. opponents

Schedule and results

Playoffs
The Boston Bruins defeated the Chicago Black Hawks in the Quarter-Finals 2–1 but lost the Semi-Final to Detroit 2–0.

Boston Bruins 2, Chicago Black Hawks 1

Boston Bruins 0, Detroit Red Wings 2

Player statistics

Regular season
Scoring

Goaltending

Playoffs
Scoring

Goaltending

Awards and records

Transactions

See also
 1941–42 NHL season

References

Boston Bruins
Boston Bruins
Boston Bruins seasons
Boston Bruins
Boston Bruins
1940s in Boston